Sigmund Christoph von Waldburg-Zeil-Trauchburg (Munich, 28 August 1754 - Salzburg, 7 November 1814) was a German Roman Catholic bishop. He was the last bishop of Chiemsee and apostolic administrator of Salzburg.

See also
 Waldburg family

Notes

References

1754 births
1814 deaths
19th-century German Roman Catholic bishops